The 2004 Mid-American Conference women's basketball tournament was the post-season basketball tournament for the Mid-American Conference (MAC) 2003–04 college basketball season. The 2004 tournament was held March 6–13, 2004. Eastern Michigan won the championship over Bowling Green. Ryan Coleman of Eastern Michigan was the MVP.

Format
The top three seeds received byes into the quarterfinals. The first round was played at campus sites. All other rounds were held at Gund Arena.

Bracket

References

Mid-American Conference women's basketball tournament
2003–04 Mid-American Conference women's basketball season
MAC women's basketball tournament
MAC women's basketball tournament
Basketball competitions in Cleveland
College baseball tournaments in Ohio
Women's sports in Ohio